The Tournament is a 2009 British independent action thriller film, marking the directorial debut of Scott Mann. The film was conceived by Jonathan Frank and Nick Rowntree while at the University of Teesside with Mann. The script was written by Gary Young, Jonathan Frank, and Nick Rowntree.

The Tournament was partially filmed in Bulgaria, and numerous locations around Northern England (where the film is set) and Merseyside. The film stars Robert Carlyle, Ving Rhames, Kelly Hu, Sébastien Foucan, Liam Cunningham, Scott Adkins, Camilla Power and Ian Somerhalder. The film received additional funding internationally, from Sherezade Film Development, Storitel Production and others, earning the film a budget of just under £4,000,000, and the film also features a renowned international ensemble cast.

However, numerous problems involving production, finance (the budget ran out twice), and securing a distributor, meant the film was not released until two years after filming, in late 2009.

Plot
A group of the world's wealthiest and most powerful men, who are themselves tied into law enforcement agencies and criminal underworlds alike, and who also control the international media with their billions, have devised the ultimate entertainment for themselves, simply referred to as "The Tournament", which takes place at intervals of every seven or ten years in an unspecified location, usually a large city.

"Contestants" volunteer, but due to the nature of the tournament are some of the toughest or craziest individuals on the planet. They are expected to kill and only the last surviving combatant will win the cash prize of $10 million. The men and women running the tournament not only view it as entertainment, but also bet high stakes on the outcome as a huge gambling tournament, serving as the source of excitement also for the millionaires.

For each tournament, combatants are selected from the world's special forces, serial killers, athletes, trained contract killers and assassins. The last combatant standing receives not only the cash prize, but also the glory and reputation of having the title of World's Number 1, and which itself carries the legendary "million-dollar-a-bullet" contract killing price tag. Each of the contestants carries a tracking device, embedded under their skin, allowing the observers to monitor their movements, and the contestants to track each other. The tournament lasts twenty-four hours, and if no one has won, then the tracking devices will explode.

The mayhem that takes place is passed off as natural disasters, terrorist outrages, accidents, or put down to rampages committed by lone madmen. The unsuspecting towns where the tournament takes place are randomly selected, and the public never know of its existence. This year, the latest tournament has come to Middlesbrough, a town in the United Kingdom - the country with the most prevalent mass surveillance in the world so that the events of the tournament can be easily followed and recorded through the ever-present CCTV as well as satellite surveillance. They also jam the communications of the emergency services, completely taking over the electronic infrastructure, and the stage is set.

The current Tournament becomes complex due to the actions of the organizers and competitors. Not only has Joshua Harlow, the winner of the last Tournament, been convinced to return because his wife was murdered and he's informed that the killer is in the Tournament, but another contestant, the Frenchman Anton Bogart, manages to remove his tracking chip, dropping it in a cup of coffee just in time for Father Joseph MacAvoy, a priest struggling with alcoholism and a crisis of faith, to drink it. With his only ally assassin Lai Lai Zhen, seeking to escape the game after her last kill, MacAvoy must race to survive before the timer runs down.

Joshua Harlow finds out in the course of the film who murdered his wife. It was Lai Lai Zhen, who had been commissioned by the organizer, Powers, with Zhen's decision to 'retire' if she wins the Tournament due to the knowledge that Harlow's wife was the first target she had who genuinely didn't know why anyone would want her dead. Removing Zhen's tracker while the two are off-camera, Harlow confronts Powers and learns that he killed Harlow's wife to provoke Harlow to return to the Tournament, reasoning that he was the kind of man who 'should' die on the battlefield. Having received his answer, Harlow forces Zhen's tracker down Powers' throat, blowing them both up in the middle of the conference room of the watching millionaires. Lai Lai Zhen and Father MacAvoy are the only survivors of the game. At the end of the film, it is shown that Father MacAvoy is once again working as a priest and has defeated his alcohol addiction.

Cast

Production
In July 2007, Entertainment Film Distributors acquired UK rights to distribute The Tournament by first-time director Scott Mann. Filming began in Bulgaria on 11 July 2007. The Tournament was also filmed in the United Kingdom in Manchester and on Teesside in the town of Middlesbrough and the surrounding area, including Newton Aycliffe and Billingham the roof top scenes are filmed in the town St.Helens. Like most independent movies, The Tournament has not been without hardship. Despite running out of money twice, once leaving the director stranded in Bulgaria, it eventually got enough funding to finish filming completely and finally complete post-production.

The film was chosen to open the Screamfest Horror Film Festival in the Mann's Chinese Theatre on 16 October 2009.

Soundtrack
Laura Karpman composed the musical score, with additional music by George Acogny, John Hunter and James Edward Barker. The film also contained music from: Ruth Jacott, Fabian "R-CANE" Schlosser, Kevin Hissink and El Rod.

Critical reception
Staci Layne Wilson, of Horror.com, gave a positive review for the film, noting that despite the plot and script lacking originality, it could be compared to films such as Smokin' Aces and The Running Man. She wrote: "[The Tournament] truly lives up to its "non-stop action" premise... ...the only other two recently released movies I can think of to top it in that arena would be the Crank films and the absolutely awesome Shoot 'Em Up."

References

External links

Interview: Scott Mann at www.KillerFilm.com

British action thriller films
2009 action thriller films
2009 films
2009 direct-to-video films
British films about revenge
Films set in England
Films shot in Bulgaria
Films shot in Los Angeles
Films shot in Merseyside
2009 directorial debut films
Films directed by Scott Mann
Films about death games
2000s English-language films
2000s British films